Asian Challenger Trophy (ACT) (Nepali: एसियन च्यालेन्जर ट्रफी) is a club  Twenty20 cricket tournament organized by Bhairahawa Queens Pvt. Ltd., a private group in Nepal run by Sushil Pandey, Niraj Aryal and Anil Bhandari. It is the biggest club cricket tournament in the country, played during the northern winter calendar, mostly in the month of January - February. It is played in a league-cum-knockout format in which top four teams qualify for the playoffs. Each team consists of 15 players.

This tournament is supported by Cricket Association of Rupendehi and  promoted by  Cricket Association of Nepal and the  National Sports Council of Nepal.

2020 
The first edition of the tournament was held from 25 February to 5 March 2020 at Siddhartha Rangashala, Bhairahawa with eight professional clubs from Asian countries made up of domestic and international players from across Asia.

Almost 24 international players took part in season one, including Sharad Vesawkar, Basanta Regmi, Rohit Paudel, Rana Naveed, Kamal Airee, Sandeep Sunar, Lokesh Bam, Kushal Bhurtel and Pradeep Airee.

Shankarnagar Cricket Club emerged as the champions.

2022 
The Second edition of the tournament will be held from 10-22 November 2022 at Kathmandu. This season six professional clubs from Asian Countries will take participate. Tournament will be play as round robin with playoff.

References

External links 
 Asian Challenger Trophy at Facebook

International cricket competitions in Nepal